The 1957 SANFL Grand Final was an Australian rules football competition.   beat  105 to 94.

References 

SANFL Grand Finals
SANFL Grand Final, 1957